William James Conybeare was an Anglican priest in the first half of the 20th century.

William James Conybeare was born on 19 December 1871 and educated at Eton and Trinity College, Cambridge.

Ordained in 1898, he was Domestic Chaplain to successive Archbishops of Canterbury then Head of the Cambridge House Lay Settlement, Camberwell. In 1909 he became Rector of Newington and in 1916 Rector of Southwell Minster and Archdeacon of Nottingham. In time he became the first Provost of Southwell, a post he held from 1931 to 1945. He died on 13 May 1955.

Notes

1871 births
1955 deaths
People educated at Eton College
Alumni of Trinity College, Cambridge
Archdeacons of Nottingham
Provosts and Deans of Southwell